Poh Kimseng (6 April 1912 – July 1980) was a Chinese sprinter. He lived in British Malaya, and competed at the 6th Republic of China National Games in Shanghai in October 1935, where he won gold in the men's 200 metres. He went on to compete in the men's 100 metres at the 1936 Summer Olympics.

References

External links
 

1912 births
1980 deaths
Athletes (track and field) at the 1936 Summer Olympics
Chinese male sprinters
Olympic athletes of China
Place of birth missing